Eric Renard Bailey (born May 12, 1963 in Fort Worth, Texas) is a former professional American football Tight end in the National Football League. He attended Kansas State University. He would play with the Philadelphia Eagles in 1987.

External links
Pro-Football reference

1963 births
Living people
Players of American football from Fort Worth, Texas
Philadelphia Eagles players
Kansas State Wildcats football players
National Football League replacement players